Mount Tongkoko or Mount Tangkoko is a stratovolcano in the north of Sulawesi, Indonesia. Its summit has an elongated deep crater. On the east flank there is a flat lava dome Batu Angus. Historical records only show eruptions in the nineteenth century.

The Tangkoko Nature Reserve is a refuge for such species as the Celebes crested macaque and spectral tarsier.

See also 

 List of volcanoes in Indonesia

References 

Stratovolcanoes of Indonesia
Active volcanoes of Indonesia
Mountains of Sulawesi
Volcanoes of Sulawesi
Landforms of North Sulawesi
Holocene stratovolcanoes